Aethalopteryx is a genus of moths belonging to the family Cossidae.

Diagnosis
Aethalopteryx is distinguished from close relatives Trismelasmos Schoorl, 1990, Acosma Yakovlev, 2011, Strigocossus Houlbert, 1916 and Azygophleps Hampson, 1892 by having cup-shaped antennae in both sexes, forewings with slight reticulated patterns and reduced arms in males gnathos and particularly genital structure of the females.

Description
Medium sized moths. Male and female antennae cup-shaped; forewing elongate with slight reticular pattern, often with a spot in the costal area and spots in the postdiscal area; hindwing with indistinct reticular pattern.

Distribution
Species are primarily found in east Africa with some distributed elsewhere in Africa or in the Arabian peninsula.

Species
Aethalopteryx anikini Yakovlev, 2011
Aethalopteryx atrireta (Hampson, 1910)
Aethalopteryx dictyotephra (Clench, 1959)
Aethalopteryx diksami Yakovlev & Saldaitis, 2010
Aethalopteryx elf Yakovlev, 2011
Aethalopteryx forsteri (Clench, 1959)
Aethalopteryx gazelle Yakovlev, 2011
Aethalopteryx grandiplaga (Gaede, 1930)
Aethalopteryx gyldenstolpei (Aurivillius, 1925)
Aethalopteryx kisangani Yakovlev, 2011
Aethalopteryx masai Yakovlev, 2011
Aethalopteryx mesosticta (Hampson in Poulton, 1916)
Aethalopteryx nilotica Yakovlev, 2011
Aethalopteryx obscurascens (Gaede, 1930)
Aethalopteryx obsolete (Gaede, 1930)
Aethalopteryx pindarus (Fawcett, 1916)
Aethalopteryx politzari Yakovlev, 2011
Aethalopteryx rudloffi Yakovlev, 2011
Aethalopteryx simillima (Hampson in Poulton, 1916)
Aethalopteryx squameus (Distant, 1902)
Aethalopteryx steniptera (Hampson in Poulton, 1916)
Aethalopteryx sulaki Yakovlev, 2011
Aethalopteryx tristis (Gaede, 1915)
Aethalopteryx wiltshirei Yakovlev, 2009

References
Cossidae of the Socotra Archipelago (Yemen)

 
Zeuzerinae